Augustinus or Augustine of Hippo (354–430) was a Christian theologian.

Augustinus may also refer to:
 Augustinus (Jansenist book), book on the writings of Augustine of Hippo
 17496 Augustinus, a main-belt asteroid
 Augustinus Hibernicus or Augustine Eriugena (fl. 655), Irish writer and philosopher
 Augustinus Triumphus (1243–1328), hermit and writer

People with the surname
 Antonius Augustinus or Antonio Agustín (1516–1586), Humanist scholar and jurist
 Norm Augustinus, American satire writer, comedian and comic artist

See also
 Augustine (disambiguation)
 Callophrys augustinus, the brown elfin, a species of butterfly
 Saint Augustine (disambiguation)